The Fifth Maine Regiment Community Center is a historic building at 45 Seashore Avenue on Peaks Island, an island neighborhood of Portland, Maine in Casco Bay. It was built in 1888 by American Civil War veterans "as a memorial to their deceased comrades and as a reunion hall for themselves." It was listed on the National Register of Historic Places in 1978 and designated a Greater Portland Landmark in 1984. Today it is open as a museum.

Description and history
Peaks Island, the largest island in Casco Bay, is east of the main Portland peninsula. The Fifth Maine Regiment Community Center is on the south side of the island, facing the channel separating it from Cushing Island.

The center is a two-story wood frame structure, 2-1/2 stories in height, with a dormered gable roof and a three-story circular observation tower at one corner. The roof extends down to shelter a porch that encircles the building. The exterior walls are finished in wooden clapboards, with bands of decoratively cut wooden shingles. The structure is built directly on a ledge that slopes down to the shore, where there is a rocky beach.

The community center was built in 1888 and is a notable example of a memorial and clubhouse built in the Queen Anne style. It was built on donated land by a fraternal association of veterans of the 5th Maine Volunteer Infantry Regiment, which sought to memorialize its fallen comrades and to provide a space for regular reunions.

The building continues to be held by that organization. It is open as a museum of local and Civil War history and events; it also functions as an event space.

See also
Eighth Maine Regiment Memorial, a similar facility also on Peaks Island
National Register of Historic Places listings in Portland, Maine

References

External links
 Fifth Maine Regiment Museum - official site

Museums in Portland, Maine
Clubhouses on the National Register of Historic Places in Maine
Queen Anne architecture in Maine
American Civil War museums in Maine
Buildings and structures completed in 1888
Peaks Island, Maine
National Register of Historic Places in Portland, Maine
1888 establishments in Maine